Susannah Sheffer is an author, editor, and activist, focusing on issues of education, prisons, and the death penalty. She is a leader in the unschooling, deschooling, and homeschooling movement. She served on the board of Holt Associates, edited the newsletter Growing Without Schooling (GWS) for many years, and edited the book A Life Worth Living: Selected Letters of John Holt. She is currently a staff member of North Star, an alternative to middle school and high school in Massachusetts.

Her books include A Sense of Self: Listening to Homeschooled Adolescent Girls, Writing Because We Love To: Homeschoolers at Work, In a Dark Time: A Prisoner's Struggle for Healing and Change, and Fighting for Their Lives: Inside the Experiences of Capital Defense Attorneys. She has also published numerous articles, essays, and book chapters on related issues.

External links
 Personal website
Susannah Sheffer on IMDb

References

Year of birth missing (living people)
Living people
American education writers
American activists